Fal or FAL may refer to:

Places 
 Fal, Fars, a village in Iran
 Fal, South Khorasan, a village in Iran
 Fal Rural District, Fars Province, Iran
 Fál or Inis Fáil, an ancient name for Ireland
 River Fal, Cornwall, England
 FAL, station code for Falmouth Docks railway station, in England

Military 
 Lebanese Armed Forces
 HMS Fal, original name of UBS Mayu, the first flagship of the Burmese Navy
 FN FAL, a Belgian battle rifle

Other uses 
 F.A.L. or Fal-Car, an automobile manufactured from 1909 to 1914
 Federal Agricultural Research Centre, a German research organisation
 File Access Listener, a network file access protocol
 Flavour and Life, an Australian food and beverage company
 Foodland Associated Limited, an Australian former company, acquired by IGA (Australian supermarket group) in 2005
 Free Art License, a popular copyright license for creative works.
 Fal (Spelljammer) a character in Dungeons & Dragons
 fal, ISO 639-3 code for the South Fali branch of the Fali languages (Cameroon)

See also

 fals (disambiguation)
 Fall (disambiguation)